Hasan Dudić (born 21 July 1957) is a Serbian Folk music singer. He was also a national boxing champion in his younger days. He is a president of non-governmental organization Centar za ljudska prava i nacionalne manjine Srbije (Center for Human Rights and National Minorities of Serbia).

Discography
Hasan Dudić released the following full-length albums:
 Kad vreme učini svoje  (1980)
 Crna ženo sa očima plavim (1981)
 Sad je kasno za novi početak (1982)
 Ne mogu biti tvoj (1983)
 Ti si mala Crvenkapa (1984)
 Hej, noći lude (1985)
 Još uvek je sanjam (1987)
 Eto to mi je (1989)
 Što me rodi majko (1990)
 Otišla je ona (1992)
 Hej moji drugovi (1993)
 Nije lako biti sam (1997)

References

1957 births
Living people
Yugoslav male singers
Serbian folk singers
20th-century Serbian male singers
Musicians from Šabac
Serbian folk-pop singers
Yugoslav boxers